Robert Eakin (March 15, 1848 – October 1, 1917) was an American judge and attorney in the state of Oregon. He served as the 19th Chief Justice on the Oregon Supreme Court. Eakin was the head judge of the court from 1911 to 1913, and was on the court overall from 1907 until 1917.

Early life
Eakin was born on March 15, 1848, in Kane County, Illinois. His parents, Stewart Bates Eakin and Catherine McEldowney Eakin, traveled the Oregon Trail to Oregon in 1866 along with his brother James A. Eakin. The family set down roots in the Eugene, Oregon area of the state. Robert Eakin attended Willamette University in Salem, Oregon, where he graduated in 1873. He then studied law in Eugene, and passed the bar in 1874.

Legal career
Following his acceptance to the state bar, he entered private practice in Eastern Oregon in Union County. There he practiced from 1875 until 1895 when he became a judge for the state circuit court’s 10th Judicial District. He served on that court until 1907.

In the fall of 1906 Eakin was elected to the Oregon Supreme Court to fill the position of Thomas G. Hailey, whose term expired in January 1907. Eakin won re-election to a second six-year term in 1912. Justice Eakin then served as chief justice of the state’s highest court from 1911 to 1913, and then resigned on January 8, 1917 to be replaced by Wallace McCamant.

Opinions authored
Stettler v. O'Hara, 69 Or 519, 139 P. 743 (1914) (labor laws)

Family
Robert Eakin married in 1876 to the former Nancy Walker. They had four children together. Eakin's younger brother James also served as a circuit judge, but in Clatsop County, Oregon. Robert Eakin died on October 1, 1917.

References

External links
Oregon Supreme Court Floatage Cases

1848 births
1917 deaths
Willamette University alumni
Oregon state court judges
People from Kane County, Illinois
Oregon pioneers
Chief Justices of the Oregon Supreme Court
19th-century American judges
Justices of the Oregon Supreme Court